Kot Sarwar is a village in Pindi Bhattian Tehsil near Sukheke. It has an interchange on the M-2 motorway which helps transport to connect nearby areas like Sukheke.

References 

Villages in Hafizabad District
Hafizabad District